Miss Universe Tanzania is a beauty pageant that was first held in 2007. It is the national contest to choose the representative for the Miss Universe pageant.

History
Miss Universe Tanzania identified was held for first time in 2007. Since that year the pageant became the official national franchise holder of Miss Universe, Miss International and Miss Earth. Since the pageant's inception, the second runner up of the Miss Universe Tanzania used to compete at Miss International until 2011 when the Miss Universe Tanzania organization severed ties with them and ceased to send representatives to said pageant. Nowadays the Miss Universe Tanzania has only franchised the main winner to Miss Universe. Inside the organizer of Miss Universe Maria Sarungi Tsehai Management; Miss Universe Tanzania, Miss Universe Ethiopia and Miss Universe Kenya are having a single franchise to present the winner as their country's ambassador to Miss Universe under Maria Sarungi Tsehai Directorship.

Titleholders

The winner of Miss Universe Tanzania represents her country at the Miss Universe. On occasion, when the winner does not qualify (due to age) a runner-up is sent.

References

External links

 missuniversetanzania.co.tz
 Official page

Beauty pageants in Tanzania
Tanzania
Recurring events established in 2007
Tanzanian awards